Yang Yunqing (Kewalin Boonsatta; born 28 September 1996), known professionally by her stage name Sunnee, is a Thai singer and actress of Chinese descent based in China. Born and raised in Bangkok, Thailand, debuted as a singer in China and gained popularity during a Chinese survival show 'Produce 101'. She was a member of the Chinese girl group Rocket Girls 101 (disbanded on June 23, 2020) after ranking 8th in the Produce 101 finals. Her first solo "Don't Cry" (不哭) was released on 19 September 2018. 

On June 24th, 2020, one day after the disbanding of Rocket Girls 101, Sunnee was being signed by the music company UMG China. UMG China provided a stage and assisted Sunnee to establish her first album "How's The Weather Today?" which was then published on September 28th, 2020. By this album, she was nominated as the "Best New Artist" by the 5th CMIC Music Awards.

Sunnee's second album "秘ME” was published on September 24th, 2021.
Sunnee's third album "计划外惊喜” was published on year 2022.

Early life and education
Sunnee was born in Bangkok, Thailand. At the age of 15, she went to Taiwan to pursue her dream of becoming a singer. She studied in Juang Jing Vocational High School in Taipei. During her stay, she was chosen by Comic Communication Co. to become an artist under them. After graduating high school, she attended Jinwen University of Science and Technology and majored in tourism.

Career

2011-2012: Pre-debut
In September 2011, Sunnee joined the 5th Global Hokkien Singing Competition Thailand Division held in Bangkok and won 1st runner-up. Afterwards, she represented Thailand in the 5th Global Hokkien Singing Competition to compete with representatives from all around the world for one month in Fujian and finished 4th runner-up.

2014-2017: First on-screen debut and debut with A'N'D
In 2014, Sunnee acted in the television series "GTO Taiwan" and "The X-Domitory", both having only cameo appearances.
On November 19, 2014, she debuted with her company's girl group, "A'N'D", also known as "Angel N Devil". Their first single, titled "Angel and Devil," was the opening theme song for "Angel 'N' Devil," where Sunnee played in the lead as Ding Dang. In the same year, the group released a single named "I'm so Lonely."

In 2015, her second lead role came soon after, playing as Feng Xiaoxiao in "School Beauty's Personal Bodyguard".

Sunnee participated in iQiyi's The Birth of a Star from 2016 to early 2017 and finished at 6th place.

2018 - 2020: Produce 101 and Rocket Girls 101

In January 2018, Sunnee played in "KO ONE: RE-CALL" as Lan Sichun, sister of Lan Siluo.

In April, Sunnee, together with other trainees from her company, participated in the Chinese reality survival girl group show Produce 101 aired on Tencent Video. Sunnee was placed 8th overall and debuted with Rocket Girls 101 on June 23, 2018.

On August 18, 2018, Sunnee, together with her group Rocket Girls 101, released their first EP titled Collide(撞) with a total of four songs. Sunnee was the member with most album sales count based on the solo supporting passage in the digital sales of the album with a total sales amount of more than 6 million Chinese Yuan. With this, Sunnee was given the chance to release a single as a reward.

On September 20, 2018, Sunnee released her first single "Don't Cry (不哭)" as a promotional song for the movie "Cry Me a Sad River(悲伤逆流成河)." On October 26, Sunnee, together with four other members of Rocket Girls 101, released a promotional song for Venom in China titled "Venom Arrives(毒液前来)." On December 20, her rewarded single titled "Sunny" was released.

From January to March 2019, Sunnee, together with Rocket Girls 101, held their first tour concert with stops at Shanghai, Beijing, and Guangzhou.

On June 22, 2019, Sunnee released an official cover of the song "Forget the Hug(忘记拥抱)" in NetEase Music as a part of their "Reset Youth Plan" Project.

In July 2019, Sunnee released her single "That me(那个我)" as a part of Rocket Girls 101's new album "The Wind(立风)." She was also once again the member with most album sales with a total sales again more than 6 million Chinese Yuan. This time, she will be rewarded with a personal EP containing two songs to be released by December 2019.

On July 29, 2019, Sunnee was nominated for the award "All Media Recommended New Artist of the Year(全媒体推荐年度新人)" in the Global Chinese Music Leaderboard(全球华人歌曲排行榜) with the awarding to be held in Macao on August 30, 2019.

From October 15 to October 17, Sunnee was jointly invited by London Q Awards and China's Q Magazine, representing one of the China's Young Talented Musicians to attend The Q Awards 2019 at Roundhouse, London.

On Dec 23, 2019, Sunnee's new EP "Qing Ge (擎歌)" was released, including 2 songs, "擎歌" and " Look at Yourself". Sunnee wrote the Chinese lyrics of " Look at Yourself".

On Dec 27, 2019, the music video of the song "Qing Ge (擎歌)" was released, followed by the dance video of " Look at Yourself " on Dec 29.

2020 - present

On June 23, 2020, Rocket Girls 101 disbanded.

On June 24, 2020, Sunnee sign in Universal Music China (UMC).

On June 26, 2020, Sunnee released the first single "By Your Side(陽光的陪伴)", the first single after she signed a new contract with Universal Music China (UMC). This song is made by the team of producer 220 (Joseph Park), who are the behind-the-scenes producer for Twice, GOT7, NCT and other popular K-Pop artists.

On August 7, 2020, Sunnee released the second single "Summer Party(夏日Party)". This song is made by Josh Fountain who produced the song "Supalonely".

On August 24, 2020, "Summer Party(夏日Party)" dance practice music video released.

On September 4, 2020,  Sunnee released her first duet song "Like a child(像孩子一樣長大)", which was a collaboration song with Huang Zitao.

On September 10, 2020, "Summer Party(夏日Party)" MV trailer released.

On September 11, 2020, "Summer Party(夏日Party)" MV released.

On September 19, 2020, the first album "How's the weather today?(天氣：晴)" pre-sale began. The pre-sales exceeded 2,500,000 songs (over 5,000,000 RMB) and it was certified by "Diamond Records" in QQ Music. Sunnee has become the fastest female singer of QQ Music to break the certification of "triple gold", "platinum", "double platinum", "triple platinum", and "diamond records" in 2020!

On September 21, 2020, the first album "How's the weather today?" Highlight medley release.

On September 28, 2020, the first album "How's the weather today?(天氣：晴)" release, the album press conference cum birthday party take place in Canton Tower.

On October 6, 2020, the first album "How's the weather today?(天氣：晴)" sales exceeded 5,000,000 songs (over 10,000,000 RMB) and it was certified by "Double Diamond Records" in QQ Music. Sunnee has become the fastest female singer of QQ Music to break the certification of "triple gold", "platinum", "double platinum", "triple platinum", "diamond records" and "double diamond records" in 2020!

On September 17, 2021, the second album"秘ME"(secret me) poster released and announce that the album will release on September 24, 2021 10:00 (GMT+8).

on September 24, 2021, the second album"秘ME" (secret me) is officially released

On December 23, 2022, the third album "计划外惊喜” (unplanned surprise) is officially released

Discography

Albums

Singles

Collaborations

Filmography

Television series

Television shows

Magazines and published works

Awards

Notes

References

External links

1996 births
Living people
Rocket Girls 101 members
Musicians from Bangkok
C-pop singers
Mandarin-language singers of Thailand
Produce 101 (Chinese TV series) contestants
21st-century Thai women singers
Thai expatriates in China
Thai expatriates in Taiwan
Thai people of Chinese descent